Anna Pavlovna Barykova (1839–1893) was a Russian poet, satirist and translator.

Life
Anna Pavlovna Kamenskaia was born on 22 December 1839 in Saint Petersburg, the daughter of the writer Maria Kamenskaia and the granddaughter of the artist Fyodor Petrovich Tolstoy. She was educated at home, at a state boarding school and at the Catherine Institute in Saint Petersburg, where she started writing verse.

She married twice and had four children. She worked for Lev Tolstoy's publishing company as a translator, where she translated verse from French, German, English and Polish. Her first volume of poetry, My Muse, was published in 1878, when she was almost 40.

Supporting economic and political justice for Russia's peasantry, she became active on behalf of revolutionary groups in the early 1880s and was briefly placed under arrest. In 1883 she anonymously published 'How Tsar Akhreyan went to God to Complain', a verse satire. The work enjoyed a wide circulation as part of efforts to encourage peasants to turn to revolutionary activity. The first, illegal printing was by the People's Will publishers in Saint Petersburg; there were also Paris and Geneva editions in the 1890s. The name A. K. Tolstoy appeared on some of these printings.

In later life she advocated Tolstoyan ideas, supporting non-violence and vegetarianism. She was a close friend and correspondent with the publisher Vladimir Chertkov, a disciple of Tolstoy. In her letters she enthuses on the advantages of a vegetarian lifestyle.

Barykova died at Rostov on Don on 31 May 1893.

Works
 Стихотворенія [My Muse], 1878
 (anon.) Сказка про то как царь Ахреян ходил Богу жаловаться [The Tale of How King Ahreyan Went to Complain to God], 1883.
 [A Votary of Aesthetics], 1884.

References

Further reading
 

1839 births
1893 deaths
English–Russian translators
French–Russian translators
German–Russian translators
Polish–Russian translators
19th-century poets from the Russian Empire
Women poets from the Russian Empire